Noa Marom is an Israeli materials scientist and computational physicist at Carnegie Mellon University. She was awarded the International Union of Pure and Applied Physics Young Scientist Prize.

Early life and education 
Marom studied materials engineering at Technion – Israel Institute of Technology and earned her bachelor's degree in 2003. After graduating, she worked as an application engineer in the Process and Control Division. She joined the Weizmann Institute of Science for her doctoral studies, earning a PhD under the supervision of Leeor Kronik in 2010. Marom won the Shimon Reich Memorial Prize for her PhD thesis. Her doctoral work considered the predictions of dispersion interactions and electronic structure using computational chemistry. She worked on molecules including copper phthalocyanine, azabenzenes and hexagonal boron nitride.

Research and career 
Marom joined the University of Texas at Austin as a postdoctoral researcher in 2010. She moved to Tulane University as an Assistant Professor in Physics in 2013. In 2016 Marom was appointed as an assistant professor at Carnegie Mellon University. She is a member of the Pittsburgh Quantum Institute.

Her work considers molecular crystals that are bound by Van der Waals interactions. As Van de Waal's interactions are weak, molecules can adopt a range of crystal structures. These are known as polymorphs, and can be predicted using computational simulations. The chemical and physical properties of these systems are determined by their crystal structure. Maron develops genetic algorithms that predict the structure of molecular crystals using the principles of survival of the fittest. Maron's work uses density functional theory and many-body perturbation theory to study complex atomic systems. She has investigated the GW approximation for molecules. The materials investigated by Marom can be used for dye-sensitized solar cells.

Awards and honors
In 2018 Marom was awarded the International Union of Pure and Applied Physics Young Scientist Prize.

References 

Israeli women academics
Israeli women scientists
Technion – Israel Institute of Technology alumni
Weizmann Institute of Science alumni
Carnegie Mellon University faculty
Computational chemists
Year of birth missing (living people)
Living people